Factotum may refer to:
A handyman, employed as a servant
Factotum (novel), a 1975 novel by Charles Bukowski
Factotum (film), a 2005 film adaptation of the novel
A character class in 3.5th edition of Dungeons & Dragons
Factotum (arts organisation), an arts organisation based in Belfast
factotum (software), an authentication system of Plan 9
"Largo al factotum", an aria from The Barber of Seville by Gioachino Rossini

See also 

List of body men, in U.S. political jargon, personal assistants to politicians or candidates